Jan Lybeck is a Swedish former sailor in the Star and Soling classes. He won the 1967 Star European Championships and 1970 Soling World Championships crewing for Stig Wennerström.

References

Swedish male sailors (sport)
Star class sailors
Possibly living people
Year of birth missing (living people)
Soling class world champions
20th-century Swedish people